Madonna of the Towers is a painting in tempera on panel of  by Bramantino, produced after his return from Rome. Previously in the church of San Michele alla Chiusa in Milan, in 1872 it was donated by Lodovico Melzi d'Eril to the Pinacoteca Ambrosiana in the same city, where it still hangs.

To the left is Saint Ambrose of Milan and to the right the Archangel Michael, with Arius and the Devil at their feet respectively. Some 17th-century additions in the sky and the towers behind the angels are still to be seen, though a tripartite frame was removed in 1956.

References

Paintings by Bramantino
1500s paintings
1510s paintings
Paintings in the collection of the Pinacoteca Ambrosiana
Paintings of the Madonna and Child
Paintings depicting Michael (archangel)
Paintings of Ambrose